The Minister of Employment and Labour is a Minister in the Cabinet of South Africa.

List of Past Ministers

Minister of Labour, 1924-1935

Minister of Labour and Social Welfare, 1935-1937

Minister of Labour, 1937-1976

Minister of Manpower Utilisation, 1976-1994

Minister of Labour, 1994-2019

Minister of Employment of Labour, 2019-present

References

External links
Department of Labour

Lists of political office-holders in South Africa